Rubén Navarro Méndez (born 6 June 1978) is a Spanish retired footballer who played as a striker.

He amassed La Liga totals of 147 games and 31 goals over seven seasons, representing Valencia, Numancia and Alavés. He added 187 matches and 57 goals in the Segunda División, in a 15-year professional career.

Club career
Navarro was born in Sallent de Llobregat, Barcelona, Catalonia. A product of Valencia CF's youth system, he first appeared in La Liga on 15 June 1997 in a 2–1 home win against Real Oviedo, but could never settle at his first club, moving to CD Numancia where he played two years; he scored ten league goals in his first season in Soria in spite of injury problems, helping barely avoid top-flight relegation.

Subsequently, Navarro joined Deportivo Alavés after the side's runner-up exploits in the UEFA Cup. He was an important attacking element for six years, three spent in the Segunda División; in three of those campaigns, he netted in double digits.

Navarro signed with another team in the second tier for 2007–08, Hércules CF. On 5 April 2009, as they eventually narrowly missed on promotion, he scored a hat-trick against Sevilla Atlético in an 8–0 home rout.

In late June 2009, Navarro returned to his native region after nearly 15 years, signing as a free agent with Gimnàstic de Tarragona for two years. On 2 September 2011, after two seasons of irregular use after which he did not have his contract renewed and was released, the 33-year-old joined CD Leganés in the Segunda División B.

References

External links

CiberChe stats and bio 

1978 births
Living people
People from Bages
Sportspeople from the Province of Barcelona
Spanish footballers
Footballers from Catalonia
Association football forwards
La Liga players
Segunda División players
Segunda División B players
Valencia CF Mestalla footballers
Valencia CF players
CD Numancia players
Deportivo Alavés players
Hércules CF players
Gimnàstic de Tarragona footballers
CD Leganés players
Catalonia international footballers